Jean-François Sénécal (born 29 June 1961) is a Canadian sports shooter. He competed at the 1984, 1988, 1992 and the 1996 Summer Olympics.

References

1961 births
Living people
Canadian male sport shooters
Olympic shooters of Canada
Shooters at the 1984 Summer Olympics
Shooters at the 1988 Summer Olympics
Shooters at the 1992 Summer Olympics
Shooters at the 1996 Summer Olympics
Sportspeople from Laval, Quebec
Commonwealth Games medallists in shooting
Commonwealth Games gold medallists for Canada
Commonwealth Games silver medallists for Canada
Commonwealth Games bronze medallists for Canada
Pan American Games medalists in shooting
Pan American Games gold medalists for Canada
Pan American Games silver medalists for Canada
Pan American Games bronze medalists for Canada
Shooters at the 1983 Pan American Games
Shooters at the 1987 Pan American Games
Shooters at the 1995 Pan American Games
Medalists at the 1987 Pan American Games
Medalists at the 1995 Pan American Games
Shooters at the 1982 Commonwealth Games
Shooters at the 1986 Commonwealth Games
Shooters at the 1990 Commonwealth Games
Shooters at the 1994 Commonwealth Games
20th-century Canadian people
Medallists at the 1982 Commonwealth Games
Medallists at the 1986 Commonwealth Games
Medallists at the 1990 Commonwealth Games
Medallists at the 1994 Commonwealth Games